Gemix is a racehorse trained by Nicolas Bertan de Balanda. Gemix won the Grande Course de Haies d'Auteuil (Gr1) in 2013 and 2014.

2008 racehorse births
Racehorses bred in France
Racehorses trained in France
Thoroughbred family 1-n